Mouretia is a genus of plant in the family Rubiaceae. It contains the following species (but this list may be incomplete):
 Mouretia tonkinensis Pit.

References 

 
Rubiaceae genera
Taxonomy articles created by Polbot